Franz Sala (1886–1952) was an Italian film actor who appeared in over seventy films, mostly during the silent era. As his acting career wound down, he began to work as a makeup artist often credited as Francesco Sala. In some of his earliest films he played leading roles, but later often played supporting parts such as in Emperor Maciste (1924).

Selected filmography

Actor 
 La signorina Ciclone (1916)
 Lucciola (1917)
 Zingari (1920)
 Le campane di San Lucio (1921)
 The House of Pulcini (1924)
 Pleasure Train (1924)
 Emperor Maciste (1924)
 Saetta Learns to Live (1924)
 Chief Saetta (1924)
 Beatrice Cenci (1926)
 Maciste against the Sheik (1926)
 Maciste in the Lion's Cage (1926)
 The Last Tsars (1928)
 Judith and Holofernes (1929)
 The Song of Love (1930)
 Before the Jury (1931)
 Cardinal Messias (1939)

Makeup artist 
 1860 (1934)
 Three Cornered Hat (1935)

References

Bibliography 
 Waldman, Harry. Missing Reels: Lost Films of American and European Cinema. McFarland, 2000.

External links 
 

1886 births
1952 deaths
Italian male film actors
Italian male silent film actors
People from Alessandria
20th-century Italian male actors